The ischiofemoral ligament (ischiocapsular ligament, ischiocapsular band) consists of a triangular band of strong fibers on the posterior side of the hip joint. Its fibers span from the ischium at a point below and behind the acetabulum to blend with the circular fibers at the posterior end of the joint capsule and attach at the intertrochanteric line of the femur.

Studies of human cadavers found that this ligament limits internal rotation of the hip, regardless of whether the hip is flexed, extended, or in neutral position.

References

External links
 

Ligaments of the lower limb